Pokémon Wii may refer to three different video games in the Pokémon series of video games for the Wii.

Pokémon Battle Revolution, released in 2007
PokéPark Wii: Pikachu's Adventure, released in 2010
PokéPark 2: Wonders Beyond, released in 2012